Yeshe Tsogyal (c. 757 or 777 – 817 CE) , also known as "Victorious Ocean of Knowledge", "Knowledge Lake Empress" (ཡེ་ཤེས་མཚོ་རྒྱལ), or by her Sanskrit name Jñānasāgara "Knowledge Ocean", or by her clan name "Lady Kharchen", attained enlightenment in her lifetime and is considered the Mother of Tibetan Buddhism. Yeshe Tsogyal is the highest woman in the Nyingma Vajrayana lineage. Some sources say she, as Princess of Karchen, was either a wife or consort of Tri Songdetsen, emperor of Tibet, when she began studying Buddhism with Padmasambhava, who became her main karmamudrā consort. Padmasambhava is a founder-figure of the Nyingma tradition of Tibetan Buddhism, and is considered as a second buddha of our era. She is known to have revealed terma with Padmasambhava and was also the main scribe for these terma. Later, Yeshe Tsogyal also hid many of Padmasambhava's terma on her own, under the instructions of Padmasambhava for future generations.

Born a princess in the region of Kharchen, Tibet, in about 777 CE, she fled from arranged marriages until captured for Tri Songdetsen. Yeshe Tsogyal lived for approximately 99 years and is a preeminent figure in the Nyingma school of Tibetan Buddhism and a role model for contemporary spiritual practitioners. Although often referred to as being Padamasambhava's main consort, Yeshe Tsogyal was primarily a spiritual master and teacher in her own right.

Based on her spiritual accomplishments, the Nyingma and Karma Kagyu schools of Tibetan Buddhism recognize Yeshe Tsogyal as a female Buddha. The translators of Lady of the Lotus-Born, the namtar, or spiritual biography, that Yeshe Tsogyal left as a terma, observe:

Biography and historicity
Given Yeshe Tsogyal's important place in the various schools of Tibetan Buddhism, there are questions about whether she is an actual historical figure. There are at least four translations of Yeshe Tsogyal's spiritual biography in English, and one in French. Yet,

Even so, in another publication, this same scholar writes,

So whether there is enough historical evidence to confirm or deny Yeshe Tsogyal as a historical figure, from the perspective of the spiritual traditions within which she is prominent, the details of her life are rich. Here are some of the details of Yeshe Tsogyal's conception and birth:

According to legend, Yeshe Tsogyal was born in the same manner as the Buddha, a mantra sounding as her mother gave birth painlessly. She is considered a reincarnation of the Buddha's own mother, Maya. Her name, "Wisdom Lake Queen", derives from her birth causing a nearby lake to double in size.

Her spiritual inclinations were present from a very young age and Yeshe Tsogyal wanted to pursue a life of dharma practice rather than marry. She felt so strongly about this, that she ran away and had to be brought back by force. At the age of sixteen, she was compelled into an unwanted arranged marriage with the then-emperor of Tibet, Tri Songdetsen.

It was after their marriage, that Tri Songdetsen invited Padmasambhava to come to Tibet from India and propagate the Buddhist teachings. Yeshe Tsogyal was given by Tri Songdetsen to Padmasambhava as an offering. Padmasambhava freed Yeshe Tsogyal and she became Padmasambhava's main disciple and consort.

Spiritual life and attainments

In the body of a woman

As to the question of the place of female practitioners in Tibetan Buddhism, Yeshe Tsogyal has been an important role model. When she herself asked about "her inferior female body" (a common theme in the biographies of female spiritual practitioners), Padmasambhava advised Yeshe Tsogyal that far from being a hindrance to enlightenment, as was generally accepted, a woman's body is an asset: "The basis for realizing enlightenment is a human body. Male or female, there is no great difference. But if she develops the mind bent on enlightenment the woman’s body is better."

After many years of serious study and meditative practice, Yeshe Tsogyal's level of spiritual awakening, enlightenment, was equal to that of Padmasambhava.

Her spiritual practices
Yeshe Tsogyal is also known to have spent many years in isolated meditation retreat. She accomplished several different cycles of tantric spiritual practices that she received from Padmasambhava and various wisdom beings including the practices of Vajrakilaya, Zhitro, tummo (inner heat),  and karmamudrā practice.

For example, one scholar relates how Yeshe Tsogyal received the empowerment to practice Zhitro from a wisdom being, a vidyādhara:

All of these practices brought Yeshe Tsogyal to awakening. Among lay Tibetans, she is understood as a fully enlightened Buddha who takes the form of an ordinary woman so as to be accessible to the average person, "who, for the time being, do not see her Vajravarahi form as a fully perfected deity."

Students
At the time of her death, Yeshe Tsogyal is known to have had eleven main students, both women and men. Yeshe Tsogyal's Zur Lineage holders include:

 Karchen Zhonnu Dronma 
 Monmo Tashi Khyidren, or Tashi Children (of Bhutan) 
 Shelkar Dorje Tsomo, or Dorje Tsomo (of Shelkar) 
 Be Yeshe Nyingpo 
 Ma Rinchen Chok 
 Odren Zhonu Pel, or Odren Pelgyi Zhonnu 
 Langlab Gyelwa Jangchub Dorje
 Lasum Gyelwa Jangjub, or Atsara Sale 
 Darcha Dorje Pawo 
 Ukyi Nyima, or Surya Tepa (of central Tibet) 
 Queen Li-za Jangchub Dronma, or Jangchub Drolma (of Khotan), Queen of Tri Songdetsen

All of Yeshe Tsogyal's final teachings were given at the request of one of these eleven main disciples.

Other Tibetan lineage holders include King Mutri Tsenpo, Prince Murum Tsenpo, Princess Ngang-chung Pelgyi Gyelmo. Nepalese lineage holders include Jila Jhipa, Vasudhara, Śākya Dema, Gelong Namkhai Nyingpo (whom she taught in Bhutan), yoginī Demo or Dewamo or Chonema or Dechenmo, Selta, and Lodro Kyi.

Along with the eleven main lineage holders, there were approximately 79 other students present during the final teachings of Yeshe Tsogyal. Some sources say that there were no less than 100 people present for these final teachings.

Emanations
Yeshe Tsogyal is also considered a manifestation of the Bodhisattva Tara. She is also considered to be an emanation of Samantabhadrī, Prajnaparamita, and Vajrayogini. In the Life of Yeshe Tsogyel, Padmasambhava predicted that Yeshe Tsogyel would be reborn as Machig Labdrön; her consort, Atsara Sale, would become Topabhadra, Machig’s husband; her assistant and another of Padmasambhava’s consorts, Tashi Khyidren, would be reborn as Machig’s only daughter, and so on. All of the important figures in Tsogyel’s life were to be reborn in the life of Machig Labdron, including Padmasambhava himself, who would become Dampa Sangye.

See also
 Khandro Rinpoche
 Lady of the Lake
 Lamrim Yeshe Nyingpo
 Mandarava
 Urgyen Tsomo

References

Citations

Works cited

Further reading
 

 

 

8th-century births
817 deaths
8th-century Tibetan people
9th-century Tibetan people
Buddhas
Dakinis
Female buddhas and supernatural beings
Padmasambhāva
People whose existence is disputed
Tibetan empresses
Tibetan Buddhist spiritual teachers
Tibetan Buddhist yogis
Women mystics
Women yogis